For the 1958 Vuelta a España, the field consisted of 100 riders; 45 finished the race.

By rider

References

1958 Vuelta a España
1958